The year 694 BC was a year of the pre-Julian Roman calendar. In the Roman Empire, it was known as year 60 Ab urbe condita . The denomination 694 BC for this year has been used since the early medieval period, when the Anno Domini calendar era became the prevalent method in Europe for naming years.

Events

 Duke Xiang of Qi and Duke Huan of Lu met at Luo(濼). Duke Huan of Lu and his wife, Wen Jiang went to Qi. 
Duke Huan of Lu died in Qi, and Qi killed Prince Peng Sheng(彭生), who was in Duke’s car. 
Troops of Qi killed Zheng-zi Wei(7th ruler of Zheng) and Gao Qumi(高渠弥).Ji Zhong(祭仲) invited Zheng-zi Ying(8th ruler of Zheng) from Chen and helped him assume the throne. 
Duke Hei Jian(黒肩) of Zhou killed King Zhuang of Zhou and plotted to help Prince Ke(克) assume the throne. Xin Bo(辛伯) reported it to King Zhuang, and killed Duke Hei Jian. prince Ke defected to Yan.

Births

Deaths
 Ashur-nadin-shumi, Assyrian king of Babylon
 Duke Huan of Lu, ruler of the state of Lu
 Luli, king of Tyre

References